Carlos Eduardo Parreira is a Brazilian football manager.
 He was most recently manager of Thai League 1 club Khon Kaen United.

Managerial statistics

References

External links

Living people
Carlos Eduardo Parreira
Brazilian football managers
1981 births